Conostephium uncinatum is a species of flowering plant in the family Ericaceae and is endemic to the southwest of Western Australia. It is an erect shrub with clustered, narrowly oblong leaves with hooked tips, and spindle-shaped flowers.

Description
This species is similar to C. minus and C. marchantiorum but has leaves with the edges more tightly turned under, and shorter flower parts.

Taxonomy and naming
Conostephium uncinatum was first formally described in 1987 by Paul G.van der Moezel in the journal Nuytsia from specimens he collected near Grass Patch in 1982. The specific epithet (uncinatum) means "hooked" and refers to the tip of the leaves.

Distribution and habitat
This conostephium grows in deep, sandy soils between Grass Patch and Clyde Hill in the Mallee bioregion of south-western Western Australia.

Conservation status
Conostephium uncinatum is listed as "Priority Two" by the Western Australian Government Department of Biodiversity, Conservation and Attractions, meaning that it is poorly known and from only one or a few locations.

References

uncinatum
Epacridoideae
Eudicots of Western Australia
Ericales of Australia
Endemic flora of Western Australia
Plants described in 1987